Arkadiusz Sojka (9 June 1980 – June 2012) was a Polish footballer.

Sojka went missing in June 2012. His body was not recovered until October 2012. The cause of death was not reported, but suicide is suspected.

References

External links
 

1980 births
2012 deaths
Polish footballers
KSZO Ostrowiec Świętokrzyski players
Polonia Bytom players
Flota Świnoujście players
Pelikan Łowicz players
Ząbkovia Ząbki players
Chrobry Głogów players
People from Krosno Odrzańskie
Sportspeople from Lubusz Voivodeship
Association football forwards
Polish football managers